The University Hospital of North Tees is a general hospital in Stockton-on-Tees, England which provides healthcare to people living in the south east of County Durham. It is managed by the North Tees and Hartlepool NHS Foundation Trust.

History
North Tees General Hospital was built in phases: the first phase, comprising the maternity department, some 50 mental-illness beds and a day hospital, started in 1965 and was completed in 1968. The second phase, comprising 440 acute beds, a further 132 mental-illness beds and an accident and emergency department, started in 1969 and was completed in 1974. In 2001 it became known as the University Hospital of North Tees.

The accident and emergency department was the subject of the BBC documentary programme Panorama in January 2014. The programme showed the pressures placed on emergency departments by waiting time targets. Then in January 2018 the BBC reported that the hospital was among those with the best waiting times in England but that patients were forced to wait in ambulances and in corridors. Staff were overworked and under pressure, many saying they would have to leave due to that reason.

See also
 List of hospitals in England

References

Hospital buildings completed in 1968
Hospitals in County Durham
NHS hospitals in England
Teaching hospitals in England
Teesside University
Buildings and structures in Stockton-on-Tees